The virvonta or virpominen (meaning the act of refreshment, or of wishing) is performed by Finnish children on Palm Sunday to wish well to the households.

In modern times, children dress as witches and knock at neighbours' doors while carrying salix tree branches (pussy willow), often decorated with colourful feathers. If accepted, they pronounce a blessing rhyme and leave a branch as gift, while receiving sweets in return.

The Swedish-speaking minority, especially in Ostrobothnia, may instead celebrate the Saturday before Easter.
This is not related to Christian tradition but Western european tradition of cattle and harvest magic that was practiced in different places.

History 

The tradition has various pagan and Christian origins: Nordic spring traditions to dispel bad spirits and wish a good harvest season, as well as the Christian ritual of the palms.
In Finland, the Orthodox tradition involves children giving blessing with branches distributed at church celebration; the variant with costumes spread from the East as the Finnish Karelians spread in the rest of Finland.

A common rhyme is "Virvon varvon tuoreeks, terveeks, tulevaks vuodeks, vitsa sulle, palkka mulle!" which translates as "I'm wishing you a fresh, healthy upcoming year, a branch for you, a prize for me!" The chant has been translated in Juha Vuorinen's novel Totally Smashed! as "Willow switch, I'm the Easter witch! I wish you health and a love that's rich! From me I bring some luck today, for this branch what will you pay?"
However, many alternatives are known.

In the 21st century, the tradition has been mixed with further examples of Anglo-Saxon trick-or-treating and various costumes. It may be more common to see kids dressed as other magical characters such as wizards, cats, bunnies or other animals.

References 

Easter traditions
Public holidays in Finland
Religion in Finland
Finnish folklore